Gajit Bista(Nepali: गजित बिष्ट) is a Nepali actor born in Bhojpur district Nepal. He worked more than 20 Nepali movies and his career was started from TV reality show Khoji partibha ko as a participant.

About 
Gagit Bista is a Nepali actor.  He started his acting career from a feature film and his debut movie is 'Mayaz Bar'. In last 15 years of his career, he has worked as an actor in more than 20 movies. Mayaz Bar, love you baba and love forever are some of his Movies. He worked on numerous music video. Sustari Sustari, Man Changa bho, Bedhana ko Bhel, Deurali bhake hajura, and Jaba ma eklai hunchu sajhama are the some of them.

Awards

Movies

Music video

Honors

References 

Living people
Nepalese actors
Year of birth missing (living people)

External Link
gajitbista.com